BRT may refer to:

Transportation 
 Block register territory, a method for dispatching trains
 British Rail Telecommunications
 Brookhaven Rail Terminal
 Brooklyn Rapid Transit Company, a former transit holding company in New York City
 Brotherhood of Railroad Trainmen, a former US railroad union
 Bus rapid transit
 Bangkok BRT, Thailand
 BRT Sunway Line, a bus  system in Malaysia
 Dhaka BRT, Bangladesh
 UD BRT, a UD Trucks bus
 Bathurst Island Airport, IATA airport code "BRT"
 Bruttoregistertonne, a unit of ship's total internal volume

Science and technology 
 Base Resistance Controlled Thyristor
 Boosted regression tree, gradient boosting used in machine learning
 Bradford Robotic Telescope
 Brain Research Trust
 BRT Laboratories, DNA sequencing laboratories

Business 
 Bayrak Radio Television Corporation, Northern Cyprus
 Belgische Radio- en Televisieomroep, later Vlaamse Radio- en Televisieomroep
 Business Roundtable, a group of US CEOs

Other 
 Big Round Top, a hill at Gettysburg, Pennsylvania
 Black Russian Terrier
 Blood Red Throne, a band from Kristiansand, Norway
 Brazilian Time, UTC−03:00